The 2007 All-Pro Team is composed of the National Football League players that were named to the Associated Press, Pro Football Writers Association and Sporting News All-Pro Teams in 2007. Both first and second teams are listed for the Associated Press.

These are the current teams that historically appear in Total Football: The Official Encyclopedia of the NFL. Although the NFL has no official awards according to the NFL spokesman Greg Aiello the NFL Record and Fact Book has historically listed All-Pro teams from major news sources such as the Associated Press, Sporting News, Pro Football Writers Association, as well as teams from organizations that no longer release All-Pro teams such as Newspaper Enterprise Association and United Press International.

The AP teams are selected by a national panel of 50 NFL writers. The Pro Football Writers Association team is from a poll of its more than 300 members and the editors and writers for Pro Football Weekly. The Sporting News's All-Pro team was determined through voting by professional NFL personnel directors.

Teams

Key
 AP = Associated Press first-team All-Pro
 AP-2 = Associated Press second-team All-Pro
 AP-2t = Tied for second-team All-Pro in the AP vote
 PFWA = Pro Football Writers Association All-NFL
 SN = Sporting News All-Pro

References
2007 AP All-Pro Team - ESPN.com
2007 All-Pro listing - Pro-Football-Reference.com

All-Pro Teams
Allpro